Arved Deringer (4 June 1913 – 25 October 2011) was a German lawyer and politician for the CDU. He was a member of the Bundestag from 1957 and 1969.

In 1952, Deringer partnered with Alfred Gleiss in a law firm that is now Gleiss Lutz. He left the firm in 1961, and partnered with Claus Tessin in Bonn. The firm, later known as Deringer Tessin Herrmann & Sedemund, merged with Freshfields and Bruckhaus Westrick Heller Loeber to form Freshfields Bruckhaus Deringer in 2000.

References

External links

1913 births
2011 deaths
20th-century German lawyers
Members of the Bundestag for Baden-Württemberg
Members of the Bundestag 1965–1969
Members of the Bundestag 1961–1965
Members of the Bundestag 1957–1961
Commanders Crosses of the Order of Merit of the Federal Republic of Germany
Members of the Bundestag for the Christian Democratic Union of Germany
Christian Democratic Union of Germany MEPs
MEPs for Germany 1958–1979